Amy Sky (born 24 September 1960) is a Canadian singer-songwriter, record producer, theatre actress, and television host. Sky started classical music lessons at the age of five, and plays piano, guitar, cello and recorder. She has a degree from the University of Toronto in music theory and composition. In 1983, Sky was signed as a staff songwriter to MCA Music Nashville, and subsequently to Warner-Chappell Music in Los Angeles, EMI Music Los Angeles, and Warner-Chappell Music Germany. As a writer she has penned songs for many artists including Diana Ross, Anne Murray, Olivia Newton-John, Reba McEntire, Belinda Carlisle, Aaron Neville, Heart, Cyndi Lauper, Mark Masri, Roch Voisine, and Sheena Easton.

Biography

Music career

In 1992, Sky's song "We Can't Look Back" was featured in the final moments and over the credits of the Degrassi TV movie School's Out. The song was co-written by Eddie Schwartz, famous for writing "Hit Me with Your Best Shot" and other Top 40 hits.

In 1996, Amy Sky released her 2nd breakthrough album Cool Rain (her first, 1989's A Breath of Fresh Air was shelved and finally released around 2010) and starred in a Toronto production of the musical Blood Brothers with David Cassidy and Michael Burgess. After being nominated for two Juno Awards, including best songwriter and best new artist, she released Burnt by the Sun in 1998, which also earned a nomination for best songwriter. The string of radio hits these albums produced garnered her three SOCAN awards. 2001 saw the release of Phenomenal Woman, which was followed in 2003 by Sky's fourth album, With This Kiss, a romance collection. In 2007, EMI released Life Lessons: The Best of Amy Sky. In 2008, Sky released a holiday album, The Lights of December. Between 2005 and 2012, she focused on her songwriting and producing for other artists.

Sky has collaborated with Olivia Newton-John several times, writing and producing songs for Newton-John's albums The Rumour (1988),  Stronger Than Before (2005), Grace and Gratitude (2006) and Christmas Wish (2007). In 2008, Sky executive produced the fund raising album A Celebration in Song: Olivia Newton-John and Friends that accompanied Newton-John's Great Walk to Beijing. In April, Sky joined Newton-John and dozens of international musicians, actors, athletes and cancer survivors to walk the Great Wall of China to raise money for the Olivia Newton-John Cancer and Wellness Centre in Melbourne. In 2009, Green Hill Records released Grace and Gratitude Renewed, which included two new songs. In 2012, Sky made her return to her solo records with the release of Alive & Awake. As a companion to the album, there was a website and monthly newsletter dedicated to sharing information about mental health self care.

Sky has been nominated for East and West Coast Music Awards, the Canadian Independent Music Awards, and the International Songwriter's Award, and in 2007 won the Canadian Smooth Jazz Award for Best Composition. She is the first recipient ever of the CRIA Applause award, recognizing her work on behalf of artist rights. Sky speaks about and advocates for mental health issues.

Other work
In 2006, Sky was honoured for her work as a spokesperson in this area, with the CAMH Courage to Come Back award, and the Mood Disorders Association of Ontario Hero Inspiration Award. She continues to advocate for "mental hygiene", and in 2008 was featured on the covers of two magazines, Canadian Health and Lifestyle and the debut issue of Anchor, speaking about this topic.

Sky has hosted three seasons of parenting shows on Rogers TV, currently Enfagrow: The Toddler Years with Amy Sky.

Sky has lent her support to many charitable causes, including the Parkinson's Foundation, Princess Margaret Hospital, National Ovarian Cancer Association, The Hospital for Sick Children, Easter Seals, Variety, MADD (Mothers Against Drunk Driving), Mood Disorders of Ontario, United Way, Wellspring, Gilda's Club, Casey House, Covenant House, Ontario Child Abuse Prevention and Zareinu.

Personal life
Sky currently resides in Toronto, Ontario. She is married to musician Marc Jordan and they have two children together, a son, Ezra and a daughter, Zoe. Both Ezra and Zoe are musicians and performers as well; Ezra performs music under the name Ezra Jordan, and Zoe performs as Zoe Sky Jordan.

Sky is a member of the Canadian charity Artists Against Racism

Discography

Albums

Singles

Guest singles

References

External links

Official site

1960 births
Living people
Actresses from Toronto
Canadian country guitarists
Canadian country singer-songwriters
Canadian women country singers
Canadian women pop singers
Canadian pop cellists
Canadian pop guitarists
Canadian pop pianists
Canadian record producers
Canadian recorder players
Canadian stage actresses
Canadian women pianists
Canadian women record producers
Jewish Canadian musicians
Musicians from Toronto
People with bipolar disorder
University of Toronto alumni
20th-century Canadian women singers
20th-century Canadian guitarists
20th-century Canadian pianists
21st-century Canadian women singers
21st-century Canadian guitarists
21st-century Canadian pianists
20th-century cellists
21st-century cellists
20th-century women guitarists
21st-century women guitarists
20th-century women pianists
21st-century women pianists
20th-century flautists
21st-century flautists